Ven Kirantidiye Pannasekera was a pioneer in environmental conservation activism starting from 1981.

He started an organization named Friends of Nature to help protect the Sinharaja Forest of Sri Lanka. He was able to form the "Sri Lanka Environmental Congress" by gathering all the scattered environmental organizations at village level in 1986. He became the first secretary in 1986. In 1987 he was instrumental in starting the first Environmental Village program by teaming up with the
National Housing authority and Central Environmental Authority in Sri Lanka.

Sources
Only One Earth - 1986 - Published by BBC and UNESCO

Year of birth missing (living people)
Living people
Sri Lankan environmentalists
Sinhalese activists